Elections to Knowsley Metropolitan Borough Council were held on 3 May 2012. One third of the council was up for election, with councillors elected at the 2008 Knowsley Council election defending their seats this time.

Due to the 'in thirds' system of election, changes in vote share are compared to the corresponding 2008 elections and calculated on that basis. After the election, Labour gained total control of the council, wiping out every Liberal Democrat councillor.

Ward results

Cherryfield ward

Halewood North ward

Halewood South ward

Halewood West ward

Kirkby Central ward

Longview ward

Northwood ward

Page Moss ward

Park ward

Prescot East ward

Prescot West ward

Roby ward

Shevington ward

St. Bartholomew's ward

St. Gabriel's ward

St. Michael's ward

Stockbridge ward

Swanside ward

Whiston North ward

Whiston South ward

Whitefield ward

References

2012
2012 English local elections
2010s in Merseyside